Buyduz (also Romanized as Būydūz and Bū’īdūz; also known as Bū’īndūz) is a village in Minjavan-e Gharbi Rural District, Minjavan District, Khoda Afarin County, East Azerbaijan Province, Iran. At the 2006 census, its population was 147, in 30 families.

References 

Populated places in Khoda Afarin County